The Golden Rooster Awards are film awards given in mainland China. The awards were originally given annually, beginning in 1981. The name of the award came from the year of the Rooster in 1981. Award recipients receive a statuette in the shape of a golden rooster, and are selected by a jury of filmmakers, film experts, and film historians. The awards are the Chinese equivalent to the American Academy Awards.

Originally, Golden Roosters were only available to mainland Chinese nominees, but in 2005, the awards opened up the acting categories to actors from Taiwan, Hong Kong, and elsewhere in an effort to compete with Taiwan's Golden Horse Awards. Films in the past two years are eligible for the Golden Rooster awards since 2007.

The Golden Rooster and Hundred Flowers Awards have taken place on alternate years since 2005, with the Golden Rooster taking place on odd years. In 1992, the Golden Rooster and the Hundred Flowers Awards were combined into a single national festival.

Awards categories
 Best Picture (最佳故事片)
 Best Director (最佳导演)
 Best Actor (最佳男主角)
 Best Actress (最佳女主角)
 Best Supporting Actor (最佳男配角)
 Best Supporting Actress (最佳女配角)
 Best Writing (最佳编剧)
 Best Directorial Debut (最佳导演处女作)
 Best Cinematographer (最佳摄影)
 Best Editor
 Best Sound
 Best Art Director
 Best Score
 Best TV Film
 Best Documentary
 Best Animation (最佳美术片)
 Lifetime Achievement Award (终身成就奖)

Award winners

References

 
Chinese film awards
Awards established in 1981
1981 establishments in China
Recurring events established in 1981
Annual events in China
Biennial events